Waseem Akhtar Shaikh  (born 1 February 1964) is a Pakistani politician who had been a member of the National Assembly of Pakistan, from June 2013 to May 2018.

Early life
He was born on 1 February 1964.

Political career
He ran for the seat of the National Assembly of Pakistan as a candidate of Pakistan Muslim League (N) (PML-N) from Constituency NA-139 (Kasur-II) in 2002 Pakistani general election but was unsuccessful. He received 25,007 votes and lost the seat to Chaudhry Manzoor Ahmed, a candidate of Pakistan Peoples Party (PPP).

He was elected to the National Assembly of Pakistan as a candidate of PML-N from Constituency NA-139 (Kasur-II) in 2008 Pakistani general election. He received 51,436 votes and defeated Chaudhry Manzoor Ahmed, a candidate of PPP.

He was re-elected to the National Assembly as a candidate of PML-N from Constituency NA-139 (Kasur-II) in 2013 Pakistani general election. He received 102,565 votes and defeated Chaudhry Manzoor Ahmed, a candidate of PPP.

References

Living people
Pakistan Muslim League (N) politicians
Punjabi people
Pakistani MNAs 2013–2018
1964 births
Pakistani MNAs 2008–2013